Arthur Bruce Pie (18 May 1902 – 30 July 1962) was an Australian politician who served in the Legislative Assembly of Queensland.

Early life
The son of Arthur Savoi Garibaldi Pie, and Annie Gertrude Pie, née Miller, Arthur Bruce Pie was born in Coburg, Victoria on 18 May 1902.

He married Jean Margaret Wright at Clayfield, Brisbane, Queensland on 24 June 1925.

Education
He attended Caulfield Grammar School 1916–1917, and played for the school's First XVIII.

Football

Caulfield Grammarians (MAFA)
He played with the Caulfield Grammarians Football Club, and was its coach on 1926.

Brisbane (QFL)
In 1924 he was captain of Brisbane Football Club, and only ceased playing for the team when he was transferred, with his employment, to Melbourne in 1925.

Melbourne (VFL)

He was the president of the Queensland National Football Association in the 1930s.

Employment
Pie worked in Melbourne and Brisbane in the importing and textile manufacturing industries, and owned his own group of businesses.

Political career
Pie was elected to Queensland Parliament in 1941 as an independent Democrat, but resigned to contest the seat of Brisbane in the 1943 federal election. He was defeated by the incumbent George Lawson, and re-entered the Queensland Legislative Assembly in 1944 as the Member for Windsor from the Queensland People's Party (QPP).

Pie succeeded John Beals Chandler as the leader of the QPP in 1946, and served in this role until 1948. In 1950 he became the Member for Kedron as a Liberal Party politician, but he resigned from the Party following a dispute about parliamentary pay increases, and resigned from Parliament in 1951.

Journey into Desolation
Pie visited the concentration camps of Nazi Germany in 1945 shortly after the end of the Third Reich, and published a book called Journey into Desolation (Pie, 1946) after this experience.

Later life
Following his political career, Pie was a member and leader of several Brisbane clubs until his death.

See also
 List of Caulfield Grammar School people

Footnotes

References
 Pie, Bruce, Journey into Desolation: The Journal of a 2,000 mile Tour through the Wreckage of the Third Reich, shortly after the Nazi Surrender, John Mills, (Brisbane), 1946.

External links

 
Demonwiki profile

1902 births
1962 deaths
Members of the Queensland Legislative Assembly
People educated at Caulfield Grammar School
Queensland People's Party politicians
Liberal Party of Australia members of the Parliament of Queensland
Australian rules footballers from Melbourne
Caulfield Grammarians Football Club players
Melbourne Football Club players
Australian sportsperson-politicians
20th-century Australian politicians
Politicians from Melbourne